Todd Grubbs is an American rock-fusion guitarist and composer, primarily of complex and melodic instrumental music.

Work as musician
Grubbs is from Tampa, Florida, and studied at Berklee College of Music in Boston.

Work as guitar instructor
Grubbs has taught guitar since the 1990s. He has released 5 full-length CDs.

Influences
In an interview on Outside Radio Hours, Grubbs stated that his influences include Jeff Beck, Steve Vai, Allan Holdsworth, John Coltrane, The Beatles, and Frank Zappa.

Discography
1994: Combination
2004: Beautiful Device
2004: Toddities
2011: Return of the Worm
2015: As the Worm Turns

External links
 Todd Grubbs official web site

References

Year of birth missing (living people)
Living people
21st-century American composers
American rock guitarists
American male guitarists
Musicians from Tampa, Florida
American male composers
21st-century American male musicians
Berklee College of Music alumni
Hillsborough Community College alumni